Marston Montgomery is a civil parish in the Derbyshire Dales district of Derbyshire, England.  The parish contains 19 listed buildings that are recorded in the National Heritage List for England.  Of these, two are listed at Grade II*, the middle of the three grades, and the others are at Grade II, the lowest grade.  The parish contains the village of Marston Montgomery and the surrounding countryside.  The listed buildings consist of houses and associated structures, farmhouses and farm buildings, a church, and items in and around the churchyard.


Key

Buildings

References

Citations

Sources

 

Lists of listed buildings in Derbyshire